There are 23 stadiums in use by Rookie league baseball teams in the United States and an additional 24 stadiums being used by teams playing in the Dominican Summer League. Of the U.S. stadiums, the oldest is Publix Field at Joker Marchant Stadium (1966) in Lakeland, Florida, home of the FCL Tigers. The newest stadium is CoolToday Park (2019) in North Port, Florida, the home field of the FCL Braves. Four stadiums were built in the 1960s, one in the 1970s, four in the 1980s, six in the 1990s, three in the 2000s, and five in the 2010s. The highest seating capacity is 15,000 at Sloan Park, where the ACL Cubs play.  The lowest capacity is 500 at the Carpenter Complex, where the FCL Phillies play. All stadiums have a grass surface.

Stadiums

Arizona Complex League

Florida Complex League

Maps

Gallery

Arizona Complex League

Florida Complex League

See also

List of Triple-A baseball stadiums
List of Double-A baseball stadiums
List of High-A baseball stadiums
List of Single-A baseball stadiums

References

 
 
Rookie league
Rookie league stadiums